Alban Davies (birth unknown – death unknown) was a Welsh rugby union and professional rugby league footballer who played in the 1930s and 1940s.

International honours
Alban Davies won 2 caps for Wales (RL) in 1943–1946 while at Huddersfield.

References

External links
Cardiff RFC Season Review 1938–1939

Cardiff RFC players
Cross Keys RFC players
Footballers who switched code
Huddersfield Giants players
Place of birth missing
Rugby league fullbacks
Rugby union fullbacks
Wales national rugby league team players
Welsh rugby league players
Welsh rugby union players
Year of birth missing
Year of death missing